John William James (13 October 1926 – 22 October 2001) was a New Zealand rower who won a gold medal representing his country in the men's coxed four, alongside Ted Johnson, John O'Brien, Bill Carroll, and Colin Johnstone (coxswain), at the 1950 British Empire Games.

James died on 22 October 2001, and his ashes were buried at Pyes Pa Cemetery, Tauranga, with those of his wife, Esme Florence James (née Rasmusen), who died in 2018.

References

1926 births
2001 deaths
New Zealand male rowers
Rowers at the 1950 British Empire Games
Commonwealth Games gold medallists for New Zealand
Commonwealth Games medallists in rowing
Burials at Pyes Pa Cemetery
Medallists at the 1950 British Empire Games